Nozarabad (also Romanized as Noz̄arābād; also known as Puzehābād) is a village in Qareh Toghan Rural District, in the Central District of Neka County, Mazandaran Province, Iran. At the 2006 census, its population was 1,991, in 560 families.

References 

Edite By Mostafa Nozari

Populated places in Neka County